Tarnovo Ice Piedmont is an ice piedmont on Rozhen Peninsula, Livingston Island in the South Shetland Islands, Antarctica is situated southeast of Charity Glacier and west-southwest of Prespa Glacier.  It extends 3.5 km in east-west direction and 2.5 km in north-south direction, is bounded to the west by Veleka Ridge, to the north by Arda Peak, Gerov Pass and Shumen Peak, and to the east by Yambol Peak, and flows southeastwards into Bransfield Strait east of Botev Point and west of Gela Point.

The feature is named after the city of Tarnovo (Veliko Tarnovo) in northern Bulgaria, the capital of the medieval Second Bulgarian Empire.

Location

Maps
 South Shetland Islands. Scale 1:200000 topographic map. DOS 610 Sheet W 62 60. Tolworth, UK, 1968.
 Islas Livingston y Decepción.  Mapa topográfico a escala 1:100000.  Madrid: Servicio Geográfico del Ejército, 1991.
 S. Soccol, D. Gildea and J. Bath. Livingston Island, Antarctica. Scale 1:100000 satellite map. The Omega Foundation, USA, 2004.
 L.L. Ivanov et al., Antarctica: Livingston Island and Greenwich Island, South Shetland Islands (from English Strait to Morton Strait, with illustrations and ice-cover distribution), 1:100000 scale topographic map, Antarctic Place-names Commission of Bulgaria, Sofia, 2005
 L.L. Ivanov. Antarctica: Livingston Island and Greenwich, Robert, Snow and Smith Islands. Scale 1:120000 topographic map. Troyan: Manfred Wörner Foundation, 2010.  (First edition 2009. )
 Antarctic Digital Database (ADD). Scale 1:250000 topographic map of Antarctica. Scientific Committee on Antarctic Research (SCAR). Since 1993, regularly upgraded and updated.
 L.L. Ivanov. Antarctica: Livingston Island and Smith Island. Scale 1:100000 topographic map. Manfred Wörner Foundation, 2017.

References
 Tarnovo Ice Piedmont. SCAR Composite Antarctic Gazetteer
 Bulgarian Antarctic Gazetteer. Antarctic Place-names Commission. (details in Bulgarian, basic data in English)

External links
 Tarnovo Ice Piedmont. Copernix satellite image

Landforms of Livingston Island
Veliko Tarnovo